Shermar Donald Emigdio Martina (born 14 April 1996) is a Curaçaoan football player who plays for FK Kauno Žalgiris and the Curaçao national team.

Club career
He made his professional debut in the Eerste Divisie for MVV Maastricht on 1 May 2015 in a game against FC Den Bosch.

In January 2022 he signed with lithuanian FK Kauno Žalgiris.

International career
Shermar made his international debut for the Curaçao national football team in a 1–1 friendly tie with Bolivia on 23 March 2018.

Personal life
He is a twin brother of Shermaine Martina, who also plays for MVV Maastricht.

Honours

International
Curaçao
 King's Cup: 2019

References

External links
 
 Soccerway Profile

1996 births
Living people
Footballers from Tilburg
Curaçao footballers
Curaçao international footballers
Dutch footballers
Dutch people of Curaçao descent
Twin sportspeople
Dutch twins
MVV Maastricht players
Eerste Divisie players
Association football defenders